Trimebutine is a drug with antimuscarinic and weak mu opioid agonist effects. It is used for the treatment of irritable bowel syndrome and other gastrointestinal disorders.

The major product from drug metabolism of trimebutine in human beings is nortrimebutine, which comes from removal of one of the methyl groups attached to the nitrogen atom. Trimebutine exerts its effects in part due to causing a premature activation of phase III of the migrating motor complex in the digestive tract. 
Both trimebutine and its metabolite are commercially available.

Brand names
The maleic acid salt of trimebutine is marketed under the trademarks of Antinime, Cineprac, Colospasmyl, Colypan, Crolipsa, Debricol, Debridat, Digedrat, Espabion, Gast Reg, Irritratil, Krisxon, Muttifen, Neotina, Polybutin, Sangalina, Trebutel, Tribudat, Tributina, Trim, Trimeb, Trimedat, and Trimedine.

See also 
 Asimadoline
 Fedotozine

References 

Dimethylamino compounds
Benzoate esters
Mu-opioid receptor agonists
Muscarinic antagonists
Phenol ethers